Terence Seu Seu (born 20 November 1987) is a New Zealand former rugby league footballer who last played as a  in the Newcastle Rugby League competition. He had previously played in the National Rugby League for the Newcastle Knights, the Cronulla-Sutherland Sharks, and the Manly-Warringah Sea Eagles.

Background
Seu Seu was born in Auckland, New Zealand.

Playing career
Seu Seu made his First Grade Debut in 2007 for the Newcastle Knights against the Bulldogs at EnergyAustralia Stadium on 18 March, scoring one try in the match.

Between 2008 and 2009 he played for the Cronulla Sharks.

He joined the Manly Sea Eagles in 2010.

In 2012 Seu Seu played for the Cessnock Goannas in the Newcastle Rugby League competition.

Representative career
Seu Seu was a part of the Samoa squad for the 2008 Rugby League World Cup.

In 2009 he was named as part of the Samoan side for the Pacific Cup.

References

1987 births
Living people
New Zealand rugby league players
New Zealand Māori rugby league players
New Zealand sportspeople of Samoan descent
Samoa national rugby league team players
Newcastle Knights players
Cronulla-Sutherland Sharks players
Manly Warringah Sea Eagles players
Cessnock Goannas players
Maitland Pickers players
Western Suburbs Rosellas players
Kurri Kurri Bulldogs players
Sunshine Coast Sea Eagles players
Rugby league hookers
Rugby league players from Auckland
New Zealand expatriate rugby league players
Expatriate rugby league players in Australia
New Zealand expatriate sportspeople in Australia